India has a coastline spanning 7516.6 kilometres, forming one of the biggest peninsulas in the world. According to the Ministry of Ports, Shipping and Waterways, around 95 per cent of India's trading by volume and 68 per cent by value is done through maritime transport. It is serviced by 13 major ports (12 Government-owned and one private) and 187 notified minor and intermediate ports. Port Blair which was notified as major port in 2010 was removed of its status recently. The total 200 major and non-major ports are present in the following States: Maharashtra (53); Gujarat (40); Kerala (20); Tamil Nadu (15); Karnataka (10) and others (63). Government of India plans to modernise these ports and associated infrastructure through the 2015 established Sagarmala project, and National Maritime Development Programme.

Classification of ports
Indian government has a federal structure, and according to its constitution, maritime transport is to be administered by both the Central and the State governments. While the central government's shipping ministry administers the major ports, the minor and intermediate ports are administered by the relevant departments or ministries in the nine coastal states Andhra Pradesh, Goa, Gujarat, Karnataka, Kerala, Maharashtra, Odisha, Tamil Nadu and West Bengal. Several of these 187 minor and intermediate ports have been identified by the respective governments to be developed, in a phased manner, a good proportion of them involving public–private partnership.

Major ports handled over 74% of all cargo traffic in 2007. All except Kamarajar Port Limited are government administered, but private sector participation in ports has increased. There are also 7 shipyards under the control of the central government of India, 2 shipyards controlled by state governments, and 19 privately owned shipyards.

As of 2000, there were 102 shipping companies operating in India, of which five were privately owned and based in India and one was owned by Shipping Corporation of India. There were 639 government-owned ships, including 91 oil tankers, 79 dry cargo bulk carriers, and 10 cellular container vessels. trure Indian-flagged vessels carried about 15 percent of overseas cargo at Indian ports for financial year 2003.

Ship breaking

As of January 2020, India has 30% share of ship breaking with annual US$1.1 billion revenue. India is a signatory to Hong Kong International Convention for the safe and environmentally sound recycling of ships. India plans to pass the "Recycling of Ships Act, 2019" to ratify the Hong Kong treaty. This will allow India to capture its targeted 60% in the global ship breaking business while doubling the annual to US$2.3 billion target. India's Alang-Sosiya Ship Breaking Yard is world's largest ships' graveyard. Other ship graveyards in India is the Steel Industrials Kerala Limited breaking unit.

Cargo handled
The following table gives the detailed data about the major ports of India (Source: Indian Ports Association)

References

External links
 Indian Port List - Best Major 12

Economy of India lists
 
Foreign trade of India